is a Japanese anime screenwriter often associated with Studio Deen, Toei Animation, and Sunrise.

He penned a number of scripts for Sunrise's anime TV series The Vision of Escaflowne, as well as writing the movie version, Escaflowne: A Girl in Gaea with director Kazuki Akane. He also worked on scripts for the 2002 Kanon anime television series.

His other major works include Ranma ½, Sailor Moon Sailor Stars, Cutey Honey Flash, Digimon Savers, DokiDoki! PreCure, and Blue Exorcist.

Anime

Television
 series head writer denoted in bold
Madö King Granzört (1989): as Shizumu Higa
Mashin Hero Wataru 2 (1991): as Shizumu Higa
Mama wa Shōgaku 4 Nensei (1992)
Ranma ½ Nettohen (1992)
Super Zugan (1992-1993)
Shippū! Iron Leaguer (1993-1994)
Mobile Fighter G Gundam (1994-1995)
Zenki (1995)
Sailor Moon SuperS (1995-1996)
Kuma no Putaro (1995-1996)
The Vision of Escaflowne (1996)
Sailor Moon Sailor Stars (1996-1997)
Revolutionary Girl Utena (1997): as Noboru Higa
You’re Under Arrest (1993-1996) 
Don’t Leave Me Alone, Daisy (1997)
Cutie Honey Flash (1997-1998)
Cowboy Bebop (1998)
Nightwalker: The Midnight Detective (1998)
Shadow Skill (1998)
Kocchi Muite! Miiko (1998-1999)
Hatsumei Boy Kanipan (1998-1999)
Chō Hatsumei Boy Kanipan (1999)
I’m Gonna Be An Angel! (1999)
Medabots (1999-2000)
Great Teacher Onizuka (1999-2000)
Hunter × Hunter (1999-2001)
 Ghost Stories (2000-2001)
 You’re Under Arrest 2 (2001)
 UFO Baby (2001)
 Kanon (2002)
 One Piece (2002-2003)
 Duel Masters (2002-2003)
 Crush Gear Nitro (2003-2004)
 Diamond Daydreams (2004)
 Zukkoke Sanningumi Kusunoki Yashiki no Guruguru-sama (2004)
 Tetsujin 28-go (2004)
 Duel Masters Charge (2004-2006)
 Mushiking: The King of Beetles (2005-2006)
 Zoids: Genesis (2005-2006)
 Project Blue Earth SOS (2006)
 Happiness! (2006)
 Digimon Data Squad (2006-2007)
 Kono Aozora ni Yakusoku o (2007)
 Zenmai Zamurai (2007)
 Kyo Kara Maoh! Third Series (2008)
 Psychic Squad (2008)
 Hakuoki ~Shinsengumi Kitan~ (2010)
 Blue Exorcist (2011)
 DokiDoki! PreCure (2013-2014)
 Gaist Crusher (2013-2014)
 Shōnen Maid (2016)
 Future Card Buddyfight Triple D (2016-2017)
 Cardfight!! Vanguard Prime (2018-2019)
 Saint Seiya: Saintia Shō (2018-2019)
 Kochoki (2019)
 Cardfight!! Vanguard Gaiden if (2020)
 Catch! Teenieping (2020-2021)

OVAs
 series head writer denoted in bold
 Madö King Granzört: An Adventure Story (1992)
 Ranma ½
 OVA (1993-1994)
 Special (1994-1995)
 Super (1995-1996)
 Nightmare! Incense of Spring Sleep (2008)
 Tekken: The Motion Picture (1998)
 Gosen Zosan e (1998-1999)
 Oni-Tensei (2000)
 Arcade Gamer Fubuki (2002-2003)
 Mizuiro (2003)

Films
 Ranma ½
 Big Trouble in Nekonron, China (1991)
 Nihao, My Concubine (1992)
 Super Indiscriminate Decisive Battle! Team Ranma vs. the Legendary Phoenix (1994)
 Sailor Moon SuperS: The Movie (1995)
 Cutie Honey Flash (1997)
 Escaflowne (2000)
 Digimon Data Squad: Ultimate Power! Activate Burst Mode!! (2006)
 DokiDoki! PreCure the Movie: Mana’s Getting Married!? The Dress of Hope Tied to the Future! (2013)

Live action

Television
 Kyuukyuu Sentai GoGoFive (1999-2000)
 Mirai Sentai Timeranger (2000)
 Sengoku Basara: Midnight Party (2012)

Films
 Mirai Sentai Timeranger vs. GoGoFive (2001)
 Sengoku Basara: Midnight Party Remix (2012)

External links
 

Sunrise (company) people
1969 births
Anime screenwriters
Japanese screenwriters
Living people